Nathalie Lind (1 October 1918 – 11 January 1999) was a Danish jurist and politician from Venstre. She notably served as minister of justice from 1973 to 1975 and again from 1978 to 1979, while concurrently also being minister of culture for the former period. She also served as minister of social affairs from 1968 to 1971.

Early life and education
Lind was born in Copenhagen on 1 October 1918. Her father involved fishing business and died when she was two years old. Then her mother took over his business in Hillerød. Lind studied law at the University of Copenhagen and received a degree in law in 1943.

Career
Lind started her career in Aalborg where her husband and she worked as a police assistant. From 1948 she began to work as a lawyer and then, moved with her husband to Virum where she ran a law firm in the period 1955–1963. She joined the Venstre and was elected to the Folketing in 1964 representing the Fredensborg constituency, but was not reelected in 1966. In 1968 she won a seat at the Folketing representing the Vardek, and served at the parliament until 1981.

Lind's first ministerial post was the minister of social affairs in the cabinet of Hilmar Baunsgaard which she held between 1968 and 1971. She was both minister of justice and minister of culture in the cabinet led by Poul Hartling from 1973 to 1975. She also served as the minister of justice in the cabinet of Anker Jørgensen in the period 1978–1979.

Lind died on 11 January 1999.

References

20th-century Danish women politicians
1918 births
1999 deaths
Danish Culture Ministers
Danish Justice Ministers
Government ministers of Denmark
Members of the Folketing 1968–1971
Members of the Folketing 1971–1973
Members of the Folketing 1973–1975
Members of the Folketing 1975–1977
Venstre (Denmark) politicians
Women government ministers of Denmark
Politicians from Copenhagen
Members of the Folketing 1977–1979
Members of the Folketing 1979–1981
Women members of the Folketing
Danish women jurists
University of Copenhagen alumni
20th-century Danish lawyers